Carbuterol (INN; carbuterol hydrochloride USAN) is a short-acting β2 adrenoreceptor agonist.

Synthesis

References 

Beta2-adrenergic agonists
Phenylethanolamines
Ureas